In information theory, redundancy measures the fractional difference between the entropy  of an ensemble , and its maximum possible value . Informally, it is the amount of wasted "space" used to transmit certain data. Data compression is a way to reduce or eliminate unwanted redundancy, while forward error correction is a way of adding desired redundancy for purposes of error detection and correction when communicating over a noisy channel of limited capacity.

Quantitative definition

In describing the redundancy of raw data, the rate of a source of information is the average entropy per symbol.  For memoryless sources, this is merely the entropy of each symbol, while, in the most general case of a stochastic process, it is

in the limit, as n goes to infinity, of the joint entropy of the first n symbols divided by n.  It is common in information theory to speak of the "rate" or "entropy" of a language. This is appropriate, for example, when the source of information is English prose. The rate of a memoryless source is simply , since by definition there is no interdependence of the successive messages of a memoryless source.

The absolute rate of a language or source is simply

the logarithm of the cardinality of the message space, or alphabet.  (This formula is sometimes called the Hartley function.)  This is the maximum possible rate of information that can be transmitted with that alphabet.  (The logarithm should be taken to a base appropriate for the unit of measurement in use.)  The absolute rate is equal to the actual rate if the source is memoryless and has a uniform distribution.

The absolute redundancy can then be defined as

the difference between the absolute rate and the rate.

The quantity  is called the relative redundancy and gives the maximum possible data compression ratio, when expressed as the percentage by which a file size can be decreased.  (When expressed as a ratio of original file size to compressed file size, the quantity  gives the maximum compression ratio that can be achieved.)  Complementary to the concept of relative redundancy is efficiency, defined as  so that .  A memoryless source with a uniform distribution has zero redundancy (and thus 100% efficiency), and cannot be compressed.

Other notions 

A measure of redundancy between two variables is the mutual information or a normalized variant.  A measure of redundancy among many variables is given by the total correlation.

Redundancy of compressed data refers to the difference between the expected compressed data length of  messages  (or expected data rate ) and the entropy  (or entropy rate ).  (Here we assume the data is ergodic and stationary, e.g., a memoryless source.)  Although the rate difference  can be arbitrarily small as  increased, the actual difference , cannot, although it can be theoretically upper-bounded by 1 in the case of finite-entropy memoryless sources.

Redundancy in an information-theoretic contexts can also refer to the information that is redundant between two mutual informations. This formulation of redundancy is complementary to the notion of synergy, which occurs when the joint mutual information is greater than the sum of the marginals, indicating the presence of information that is only disclosed by the joint state and not any simpler collection of sources.

See also
 Minimum redundancy coding
 Huffman encoding
 Data compression
 Hartley function
 Negentropy
 Source coding theorem
 Overcompleteness

References

 
 
 

Information theory